Shuangjing Town is a town and the county seat of Tongdao Dong Autonomous County in Hunan, China. The seat of local government is at Zhaishang Village.()

References

Tongdao
County seats in Hunan